Cottonwood Creek is a stream that flows from rural Canadian County through portions of Logan County until it reaches its mouth at the Cimarron River, northwest of Guthrie.

Significant tributaries of Cottonwood Creek include Chisholm Creek and Deer Creek. Its source is located in rural Canadian County northwest of the city of Piedmont. The stream drains approximately 320 square miles.

The creek has often caused flooding in Guthrie. It is also the namesake of the Cottonwood Flats Festival Ground in Guthrie.

Historic flood levels

References

Rivers of Oklahoma